The Fairly OddParents: Fairly Odder is an American comedy live-action/animated television series developed by Christopher J. Nowak that premiered on Paramount+ on March 31, 2022. It is a sequel to Nickelodeon's original animated series, The Fairly OddParents.

Premise 
Picking up years after the original animated series, the new series follows Timmy Turner's cousin, Vivian "Viv" Turner, and her new stepbrother, Roy Raskin, as they navigate life in Dimmsdale with the help of their fairy godparents, Cosmo and Wanda, who are gifted to them by a now older Timmy when he leaves for college.

Cast

Live cast 
 Audrey Grace Marshall as Vivian "Viv" Turner, a newcomer to Dimmsdale to move in with her new family, who after inheriting the fairies Cosmo and Wanda from her cousin Timmy, must share the wishes with her stepbrother Roy
 Tyler Wladis as Roy Raskin, a local star in Dimmsdale on the school basketball team, who shares the wishes of the fairies Cosmo and Wanda with his stepsister, Viv, whom he quickly grows fond of. Unknown to him, Zina has a huge crush on him.
 Ryan-James Hatanaka as Ty Turner, Viv's father and Roy's stepfather, who works as a semi-professional dancer. He shares this passion with Rachel
 Laura Bell Bundy as Rachel Raskin, Roy's mother and Viv's stepmother, who works as a ballroom dancer. She shares this passion with Ty
 Imogen Cohen as Zina Zacarias, Viv's best friend, and has a huge crush on Roy

Voice cast 
 Susanne Blakeslee as Wanda, one of Viv and Roy's fairy godparents, and the wife of Cosmo. Blakeslee reprises her role from the original animated series and films
 Daran Norris as Cosmo, one of Viv and Roy's fairy godparents, and Wanda's husband; and Jorgen Von Strangle, the strict leader of the fairies. Norris reprises his roles from the original animated series and films

Guest stars 
 Garrett Clayton as Dustan Lumberlake, a famous pop music star
 Mary Kate Wiles as Vicky, an evil teacher at Dimmsdale Junior High, and Timmy Turner's former babysitter
 Carlos Alazraqui as Denzel Crocker, a former teacher at Dimmsdale Junior High who is obsessed with fairies. Alazraqui reprises his role from the original animated series in live-action and animation
 Caleb Pierce as Timmy Turner, the protagonist of the original Fairly OddParents series and Viv's cousin, to whom he gives his fairies Cosmo and Wanda to before leaving for college

Episodes

Production 
The series was announced in February 2021, with Butch Hartman and Fred Seibert returning as producers, and Christopher J. Nowak serving as both executive producer and showrunner. The series started production in July 2021. The animation was outsourced to the Tijuana-based Boxel Studio. All 13 episodes were released on Paramount+ on March 31, 2022. In January 2023, the series was removed from Paramount+ and Nickelodeon's official website in the U.S.

Reception

Critical response 
Diondra Brown from Common Sense Media gave the series three-out-of-five stars, calling it "a family-friendly show with eccentric comedy and a meaningful nod to the original comedy series."

Awards and nominations

References

External links 
 
 

English-language television shows
Paramount+ original programming
2020s American comedy television series
American sequel television series
The Fairly OddParents
2022 American television series debuts
2022 American television series endings
Paramount+ children's programming
Nickelodeon original programming
American children's television sitcoms
American television series with live action and animation
Television series about children
Television series about families
Television about fairies and sprites
Television about magic
Television series created by Butch Hartman
Television shows set in California
Works based on animated television series